Luis Baltazar Ramírez Zapata (born 6 January 1954) is a retired Salvadoran footballer.

Club career
Nicknamed El Pelé, he spent nearly 20 years playing for Salvadoran club Águila. He started with Águila, after being recommended by Brazilian technical director Arnaldo Da Silva, under the legendary Juan Francisco Barraza before leaving to join other clubs and later in his career make a return to the San Miguel based club. He also would go on to play for Atlético Marte and Alianza in his homeland El Salvador and spent time abroad playing for Cartaginés in Costa Rica, scoring 11 goals, and Puebla in Mexico. In 1990, he played for the Washington Diplomats of the American Professional Soccer League.

International career
Ramírez represented El Salvador at the 1975 Pan American Games in Mexico. He also represented his country in 24 FIFA World Cup qualification matches and was a member of the El Salvador team at the 1982 World Cup in Spain. During the tournament, he scored their only goal in World Cup history. It came in the infamous 10–1 defeat to Hungary on 15 June 1982, which remains the single biggest loss for a team in the competition's history.

Ramírez Zapata scored 16 goals for the El Salvador national football team from 1971 to 1989.

His final international game was an August 1989 FIFA World Cup qualification match against Trinidad & Tobago.

International goals
Scores and results list El Salvador's goal tally first.

Managerial career and personal life
His first job as a manager was at Águila, where he replaced Panamanian coach Gary Stempel in 2007. After his own dismissal, he coached Atlético Balboa and Salvadoran second division side ADI F.C., before joining the Department of Culture and Sports of the San Miguel mayorship. He was sacked by the municipal council in October 2011.

Honours
 Águila
 Primera División (5): 1972, 1975–76, 1976–77, 1983, 1987–88
CONCACAF Champions' Cup (1): 1976

References

External links
Biography – El Gráfico 
Honored by City of San Miguel Article  
Luis Baltazar Ramírez "Pelé" Zapata – C.D. Atlético Marte 

1954 births
Living people
Sportspeople from San Salvador
Association football forwards
Salvadoran footballers
El Salvador international footballers
1982 FIFA World Cup players
Footballers at the 1975 Pan American Games
Pan American Games competitors for El Salvador
C.D. Águila footballers
C.S. Cartaginés players
Alianza F.C. footballers
Club Puebla players
Platense F.C. players
Washington Diplomats (1988–1990) players
C.D. Atlético Marte footballers
Liga MX players
American Professional Soccer League players
Salvadoran expatriate footballers
Expatriate footballers in Costa Rica
Expatriate footballers in Honduras
Expatriate footballers in Mexico
Expatriate soccer players in the United States
Salvadoran expatriate sportspeople in Costa Rica
Salvadoran expatriate sportspeople in Mexico
Salvadoran expatriate sportspeople in the United States
Salvadoran football managers
C.D. Águila managers